Robert Mark Kamen (born October 9, 1947) is an American screenwriter, best known as creator of The Karate Kid franchise, as well as for his later collaborations with French filmmaker Luc Besson, which includes the screenplay for The Fifth Element (originally devised by Besson) and the Transporter and Taken franchises. He now produces wine from his vineyards near Sonoma, California.

Early life and education
Kamen was born in 1947. He grew up in the Bronx in New York City. He graduated from New York University in 1969. He received his Ph.D. in American Studies from The University of Pennsylvania.

Career
Kamen is a frequent collaborator of French writer and director Luc Besson, who co-created The Fifth Element, The Transporter, and the Taken series. The two first worked together on the Natalie Portman and Jean Reno thriller The Professional. After the success of The Fifth Element, Besson invited Kamen to join him in his goal of creating a "mini-studio" in Europe, making "movies that would travel, international movies, you know, action movies."

The Karate Kid
The Karate Kid is a semi-autobiographical story based on Kamen's life. When Kamen was 17, he was beaten up by a gang of bullies after the 1964 New York World's Fair. He thus began to study martial arts in order to defend himself. Kamen was unhappy with his first teacher who taught martial arts as a tool for violence and revenge. He moved on to study Okinawan Gōjū-ryū Karate under a teacher who did not speak English but himself was a student of Chōjun Miyagi.

As a Hollywood screenwriter, Kamen was mentored by Frank Price, who told him that producer Jerry Weintraub had optioned a news article about the young child of a single mother who had earned a black belt to defend himself against neighborhood bullies. Kamen then combined his own life story with the news article and used both to create the screenplay for The Karate Kid.

DC Comics had a character called "Karate Kid." The filmmakers received special permission from DC Comics in 1984 to use the title for the first film (and subsequent sequels).

Vineyards
In 1980, after being paid $135,000 for his first screenplay (which was never produced), Kamen used the check to buy 280 acres of rocky land on western slopes of the Mayacamas mountains north of Sonoma in Sonoma County, California. He hired winegrower Phil Coturri to make 46 acres into a vineyard in 1981. In 1984, the first grapes were sold to local winemakers. Half the vineyard was destroyed in a fire in 1996. Kamen replanted the vineyard, and in 1999 he bottled his first Kamen-branded wine, a Cabernet Sauvignon. In 2002, Kamen hired Mark Herold to craft his wines.

Filmography

References

External links

The Karate Kid and Cobra Kai - Reunited Apart, December 21, 2020

1947 births
Living people
American male screenwriters
American winemakers
Film producers from New York (state)
Jewish American screenwriters
New York University alumni
Screenwriters from New York (state)
Television producers from New York City
University of Pennsylvania alumni
Writers from the Bronx
21st-century American Jews